The 1971 Montana Grizzlies football team was an American football team that represented the University of Montana in the Big Sky Conference during the 1971 NCAA College Division football season. In their fifth year under head coach Jack Swarthout, the Grizzlies played home games at Dornblaser Field in Missoula and compiled a 6–5 record (3–2 Big Sky, third).

Schedule

References

External links
Montana Grizzlies football – 1971 media guide

Montana
Montana Grizzlies football seasons
Montana Grizzlies football